Joshua Harmon may refer to:

 Joshua Harmon (poet) (born 1971), American poet, novelist, short story writer, and essayist
 Joshua Harmon (playwright) (born 1983), New York City-based playwright